The Harsdorff House (Harsdorffs Hus) is a historic property located on Kongens Nytorv in central Copenhagen, Denmark. It was built by Caspar Frederik Harsdorff in 1780 and was in the same time to serve as inspiration for the many uneducated master builders of the time. The Ministry of Foreign Affairs was based in the building from 1864 to 1923.

History

Background and construction
 

Caspar Frederik Harsdorff (1735–1799) became professor of perspective at the Royal Danish Academy of Fine Arts in 1766. In 1770 he succeeded Nicolas-Henri Jardin  (1720–1799) as royal building master and the following year he took over his residence in the south wing of Charlottenborg Palace. The Royal Academy's secretary, Christian Æmilius Biehl, had a residence next to the palace. His daughter, Charlotte Dorothea Biehl (1731–1788) spend some of her childhood in the building. After Biehl's death the building was designated for demolition and Harsdorff was consulted on the matter. He proposed that the site was given to him and he would build a house which could serve as inspiration for the builders of the increasing number of bourgeois houses in the city. 

Architects who had studied at the Academy were in general only used by the state and members of the aristocracy. The king accepted the offer. Construction began in 1779 and was completed in 1780. The building was never actually used by Harsdorff personally.

Tenants

 
Frenchman, Eugen Vincent, who had previously served as cook for Prince Ferdinand, opened Restaurant Vincent in the building in the first half of the 19th century. The restaurant was later operated by his widow Eva Severine Vincent (née Rasmussen) and son Alexander Vincent under the name Madame Vincent. It was visited by Jules Verne during his visit to Copenhagen in 1861.

The merchant and politician Alfred Hage (1803-1872) lived in the building from 1862 and until his death in 1872.

Court photographer Jens Petersen  (1829-1905)  operated a photographic studio in the building from 1865 to 1875.

The Ministry of Foreign Affairs was based in the building from 1864-1923. It was then  based at Christiansborg Palace and the Yellow Mansion in Amaliegade until its new building at Asiatisk Plads was completed in 1983.

Architecture
Caspar Frederik Harsdorff favoured French classicism inspired by ancient Greece and Rome.

The odd-shaped corner site inspired Harsdorff to build a property with three different model facades. The more monumental, central section is decorated with Ionic order pilasters and crowned by a triangular pediment with relief decoration.

The house came to serve as inspiration for hundreds of houses in the rebuilding of Copenhagen during the years after the Great Fire of 1795.

Today
The building was restored under the direction  of architectural firm   Fogh & Følner in 1999.
The building is now owned by real estate company  Karberghus A/S. The tenants include the Harsdorffs Hus  Office Club.

References

Other sources
 Architectural renderings from the Danish National Art Library

External links
 Harsdorffs Hus Office Club  website
Karberghus   website

Gammelholm
Houses in Copenhagen
Caspar Frederik Harsdorff buildings
Houses completed in 1780
 Source